The 2015 Robert Morris Colonials football team represented Robert Morris University during the 2015 NCAA Division I FCS football season. They were led by second-year head coach John Banaszak and played their home games at Joe Walton Stadium. They were a member of the Northeast Conference. They finished with a record of 4–7, 2–4 in NEC play, to finish in sixth place.

Previous season
In 2014, Robert Morris finished with a record of 1–10, 1–5 in NEC play, to finish in sixth place. They failed to qualify for the FCS Playoffs.

Schedule

Game summaries

Dayton

Youngstown State

Notre Dame (OH)

South Dakota State

Wagner

Sacred Heart

Duquesne

Central Connecticut

East Tennessee State

Saint Francis (PA)

Bryant

References

Robert Morris
Robert Morris Colonials football seasons
Robert Morris Colonials football